TVR Tîrgu-Mureș is one of the six regional branches of the Societatea Română de Televiziune (Romanian Public Television). It began broadcasting on 6 May 2008, in Târgu Mureș. TVR Tîrgu-Mureș programmes are broadcast in the Transylvania region of Romania, covering five counties in the central part of the country.

TVR Tîrgu-Mureș broadcasts in Romanian and Hungarian languages.

References

External links
 TVR

Tirgu Mures
Mass media in Târgu Mureș
Television channels and stations established in 2008
Television stations in Romania